Lindberg Park is a suburb of Johannesburg, South Africa. It is located in Region F of the City of Johannesburg Metropolitan Municipality.

History
Prior to the discovery of gold on the Witwatersrand in 1886, the suburb lay on land on one of the original farms called Turffontein. It became a suburb on 20 May 1955. Originally called Turf Club Extension it was eventually named after Albert Victor Lindberg a CNA bookstore director.

References

Johannesburg Region F